Nichlas is a masculine given name. Notable people with this name include the following:

Nichlas Falk (born 1971), Swedish ice hockey player
Nichlas Hardt (born 1988), Danish ice hockey player
Nichlas Rohde (born 1992), Danish footballer.
Nichlas Torp (born 1989), Swedish ice hockey player
Nichlas Vilsmark (born 1973), Danish florist

See also

Niclas
Nicholas
Nicklas (name)

Masculine given names